USS Waukegan, was a medium harbor tug that was acquired by the United States Navy in September 1964 from the United States Army for which she had served as LT-1968. Named Waukegan and designated YTM-755, she was assigned to the 10th Naval District at San Juan, Puerto Rico. The tug was based there for her entire 11-year naval career, serving ships in the 10th Naval District. In September 1975, she was placed out of service; and her name was struck from the Navy list. She was subsequently disposed of by sale. Her current status is unknown.

Ship awards
National Defense Service Medal

External links

1954 ships
Ships of the United States Navy